The 2006 European GP2 Series round were a pair of motor races held on 6 and 7 May 2006 at the Nürburgring in Nürburg as part of the GP2 Series. It was the third round of the 2006 GP2 season.

Classification

Qualifying

Feature Race

Sprint Race

Standings after the round

Drivers' Championship standings

Teams' Championship standings

 Note: Only the top five positions are included for both sets of standings.

Notes

References

External links 
 Official website of GP2 Series

San Marino
GP2